INSAT-1D was 4th and the concluding multipurpose geostationary satellite of the INSAT-1 (first-generation seven-year responsibility for the operation of the INSAT space segment.

But the success of this launch meant a lot to India - a country that was setting up its national computer networks. Relying on a lot of communication circuits, microwave, coaxial, and fibre-optic telecommunication links throughout the country causes a huge problem; and thus the Indian Space Research Organisation (ISRO) planned at the start of the INSAT-1 series to always have at least two satellites in space to meet the increasing demand of telecommunication links for India's civilian community. INSAT-1A and INSAT-1C had already faced immature death and their plans had suffered a serious setback. Another satellite INSAT-1B, launched in 1983, exceeded its planned seven-year working life.

Launch
INSAT 1D was built by Ford Aerospace (now Loral Inc) for the Indian National Satellite System. Initially, the launch was scheduled for 29 June 1989. Unfortunately, 10 days before that, during launch preparation, a launchpad hoist cable broke and a crane hook fell on it damaging its C-band reflector. The fully insured satellite was repaired by Ford Aerospace at a reported cost of $10 million. But that mishap was followed by solar panel damage of cost $150,000 suffered during the 1989 San Francisco earthquake. The satellite was finally launched from Launch Complex 17B, Cape Canaveral Space Force Station, United States with the Delta 2 rocket. It had a 7-year life expectancy.

Structure
A solar sail and  solar panel extended overall length to  when deployed. It was housed 12 C-band transponders for telephone and data communications and two S-band transponders for direct broadcast service. A very high-resolution radiometer (VHRR) was installed for meteorological imagery for long-term weather forecasting, storm warning and resource management.

INSAT-1D played a vital role in replacing INSAT-1B. Moreover, at that moment India already had hired Arabsat's 12 transponders at high cost (the rate of $800,000 per transponder per year). Failure of the 1D mission would compel the government to hire more transponders.

See also

Indian Space Research Organisation
INSAT-1A
INSAT-1B
INSAT-1C
1990 in spaceflight
List of Indian satellites

References

Second-generation the Second-generation the External links
 ISRO Satellite Centre, Bengaluru - SALIENT FEATURES OF INSAT-1D
 ISRO - INSAT-!D 
 NASA Space Science Data Coordinate Archive

INSAT satellites
Spacecraft launched in 1990
1990 in India